ZAC Browser (Zone for Autistic Children) is a web browser designed specifically for children and teenagers with autism spectrum disorders, pervasive developmental disorders (PDD), and PDD-NOS.

Because autistic children display characteristics such as impairments in social interaction, impairments in communication, restricted interests and repetitive behavior, the standard browser experience can often be overwhelming. The ZAC browser reduces the number of user interface controls and removes access to much of the Web in order to simplify the experience for autistic children.

ZAC was available as a free download for Windows 98/ME/2000/XP/Vista/7, but is no longer maintained.

History
John LeSieur had a grandson named Zack who was diagnosed with severe autism at the age of 3. Because of the autism, the child was often very frustrated when using the computer. LeSieur owned People CD Inc., a software production company, and released a web browser for children called KidCD in 2006. KidCD proved helpful for Zack, as he was able to use the computer on his own.

In 2008, KidCD 2.0 was released and added a feature that automatically switched icons on the screen. This feature was problematic for autistic children, who generally prefer very organized displays. LeSieur then developed an alternative version of KidCD 2.0, called ZAC Browser, which added aquarium graphics to the main page along with stationary icons. The specialty browser was designed to enable children with autism to use and benefit from the same types of websites other children use, including Sesame Street and PBS Kids.

System requirements

See also
 List of web browsers

References

External links

Review of ZAC browser by PC World, Kim Saccio-Kent
People CD

Software for children
Web accessibility
Web browsers
Windows-only freeware